The Berlin State Ballet is the principal ballet company in the German capital of Berlin. It was created in 2004 through a merger of the separate ballet companies of the city's three opera houses at a time when the city was going through a financial crisis. It is one of the largest ballet companies in Western Europe with approximately 90 dancers.

The Berlin State Ballet inaugural general and artistic director, dancer and choreographer Vladimir Malakhov, was a director of the ballet of the Berlin Opera before the companies merged to form the Berlin State Ballet. He led the company for ten years, creating a mixed repertoire of classical titles and contemporary choreography. A star dancer himself, Malakhov was not only managing, but also performing with the company.

In 2014, Nacho Duato became general and artistic director at the Berlin State Ballet with an initial five years term. He created new choreography for the company, and oversaw restagings of some of his signature ballets, created in Madrid, St. Petersburg and Munich, in Berlin. In 2016, Michael Müller, Mayor of Berlin, announced that the city will not extend Duato's contract with the company when it expires in 2019. For the 2018/19 season, Johannes Öhman took over as Director of the Staatsballett Berlin; for the 2019/20 season, he was joined by Sasha Waltz in a co-directorship. Christiane Theobald took over as provisional artistic director in August 2020.

References

External links
  

Ballet
Companies based in Berlin
Dance in Germany
Ballet companies in Germany
Performing groups established in 2004